The 2018–19 season was Dukla Prague's eighth consecutive season in the Czech First League and culminated in their relegation. The club made the worst start ever by any club in the first league, losing seven consecutive matches at the beginning of the season under Pavel Drsek, who was replaced in September 2018 by Roman Skuhravý.

Players

Squad information

Transfers

In 
Dukla signed four players permanently in the summer; as well as midfielder Štěpán Krunert joining from Bohemians 1905, three defenders arrived: Dávid Bobál signed from Budapest Honvéd FC, Martin Chlumecký arrived from Liberec, and Daniel Souček joined from Slavia Prague. Midfielder David Breda and forward Ondřej Štursa joined on loan from Jablonec and Viktoria Plzen respectively. Defenders Ján Ďurica and Nikola Raspopović joined in September 2018.

In the winter break, Spanish midfielder Pablo González joined the club from Salamanca. Czech striker Vojtěch Hadaščok and Czech defender Daniel Kozma also joined the club. Lukáš Holík and Róbert Kovaľ returned to Dukla for the second half of the season after their loans expired. Samuel Dancák returned from his loan ahead of schedule to join Dukla for the second half of the season.

Out 
In the summer, defenders Martin Jiránek and Ondřej Kušnír, and midfielder Štěpán Koreš left Dukla after the expiry of their contracts. Mario Holek and Néstor Albiach returned to Sparta Prague after their loans at Dukla expired. Dominik Preisler joined FC Vysočina Jihlava on loan, while Lukáš Holík was loaned to his previous club, Zlín. Samuel Dancák went out on a season-long loan to Olympia Radotín.

Striker Ivan Schranz and midfielder Frederik Bilovský left in the mid-season break to join AEL Limassol and FC Nitra respectively. Defender Dávid Bobál left after the expiry of his contract. David Breda and Ondřej Štursa returned to their parent clubs after the expiry of their loans. David Bezdička left to join Teplice on loan, while Martin Chlumecký was loaned to FC Vysočina Jihlava.

Management and coaching staff

Source:

Statistics

Appearances and goals

Home attendance
The club had the lowest average attendance in the league.

Czech First League

Regular season

Results by round

Results summary

League table

Matches

Relegation group

League table

Matches

Cup 

As a First League team, Dukla entered the Cup at the second round stage. In the second round, Dukla travelled to  Bohemian Football League side Písek, Dukla winning 2–0 with both goals coming in the first half of the match. The third round match was away against Viktoria Žižkov of the Czech National Football League. The game was decided by Frederik Bilovský's 81st minute goal. In the fourth round, Dukla hosted league rivals Teplice and lost 3–1, concluding their cup run for another season.

References 

Dukla Prague
FK Dukla Prague seasons